Warner Springs is set of springs and a small unincorporated community in northern San Diego County, California.  Warner Springs is on the Pacific Crest Trail.

Geography
Warner Springs has a post office and the ZIP code is 92086. It is located near the Palomar Observatory and Warner Springs Ranch. It is located on State Route 79, which connects to the city of Temecula to the north and the communities of Santa Ysabel and Julian to the south.

Warner Springs is also a popular area for gliding, due to the topography of the Peninsular Ranges in the area.

History
The Cupeño people were long time indigenous inhabitants of the Warner Springs area. The Cupeño/Cahuilla Agua Caliente rancheria village was located at the hot springs (Spanish: agua caliente) located here.

The hot springs were discovered by Spanish explorers of upper Las Californias province in 1795.

19th century

The St. Francis of Assisi chapel was erected near the settlement around 1830. Its walls use adobe mud bricks, white-washed over and a roof incorporating locally made red tiles. A stone bell tower is placed next to the southern wall of the church.

Warner's Ranch

Juan Jose Warner received the  Rancho San Jose del Valle Mexican land grant in 1844, and renamed the area Warner Springs. Also in 1844, the asistencia's lands on the south became part of the Rancho Santa Ysabel Mexican land grant. In 1851, the Cupeño/Cahuilla "Garra Revolt" raid on Warner's Ranch occurred, a part of the Yuma War against immigrant intrusions.

The Warner's Ranch adobe complex of Juan Jose Warner was a way station for large numbers of emigrants on the Southern Emigrant Trail from 1849 to 1861, as it was a stop on the Southern Emigrant–Gila River Trail. He opened the only trading post that served travelers on the trail between New Mexico Territory and the Pueblo de Los Angeles in Alta California. It later became a stop on the San Antonio-San Diego Mail Line in 1857, and the Oak Grove Butterfield Stage Station stop on the Butterfield Overland Mail stagecoach line (1857–1861).

At the start of the Civil War in 1861, stagecoach service was discontinued and the Union Army established Camp Wright, a cavalry outpost at the ranch to protect the route from Southern California to Fort Yuma, and to intercept secessionist sympathizers attempting to the join the Confederate armies in the American South and in the Arizona Territory.

Former California Governor John Downey purchased the Warner Springs Ranch in 1880, to graze cattle and sheep herds. In 1892, after years of disputes with the Cupeños living at the ranch, Downey sued to evict the Indians. In 1894, after Downey's death, the U.S. Supreme Court ruled against the Cupeños.  The eviction order came in 1901 and their exodus two years later became known as the “Cupeno Trail of Tears.”

20th century
William Henshaw purchased the Warner Springs Ranch in 1911, and had Henshaw Dam completed by latter 1922 and its reservoir filled by 1924. In 1978, the reservoir level was lowered 40% due to danger from the Elsinore Fault Zone running beneath the dam. Also in 1978, a visiting author described it as "a pleasant, quiet, leisurely-paced village."

Several Warner Spring sites and buildings were designated California Historical Landmarks (CHL), and/or National Historic Landmarks (NHL), and/or listed on the National Register of Historic Places (NRHP) in the 20th century.
 Camp Wright (CHL)
 Oak Grove Butterfield Stage Station (CHL), (NHL), (NRHP)
 Warner's Ranch (CHL), (NHL), (NRHP)

See also
 Spanish and Mexican ranchos of San Diego County, California

References

Reference bibliography

External links

 
Unincorporated communities in San Diego County, California
Cupeno
History of San Diego County, California
Unincorporated communities in California